Cashino (a portmanteau word combining "cash" and "casino") is a British gambling company, with over 148 high street venues and an online presence. It is part of Praesepe Holdings L.t.d., which is in turn owned by the German gaming and gambling company Gauselmann.

Overview
In April 2014, it was announced that Simon Gudgeon had been appointed as Northern operations manager, alongside Steve Ambrose, who covers the South of the UK, for the 148 venue Cashino chain of "adult gaming centres".

Cashino.com is owned by Merkur Interactive Malta p.l.c., No. 2, Geraldu Farrugia Street, Zebbug, ZBG 4351, Malta and operated under the licence of Merkur Intractive Malta p.l.c., a limited company incorporated in Malta with the company number C 40619 Merkur Interactive Malta p.l.c. is regulated by the UK Gambling Commission and holds a licence issued on 11 May 2016 under the Gambling Act 2005. Gambling debts are enforceable under UK law.

References

External links
 
 

Gambling companies of the United Kingdom
Gambling websites